The Museum of Korean Embroidery is a museum in Seoul, South Korea. It originally opened in 1976 and moved to its current location in Seoul's Nonhyeong-dong Gangnam-gu in 1991.  The museum hold several national treasures and has loaned pieces for traveling exhibits.

Free admission.  Open Weekdays 10:00 AM to 06:00 PM. Closed weekends and holidays.

'''34, Nonhyeon-ro 132-gil, Gangnam-gu, Seoul
서울특별시 강남구 논현로132길 34 (논현동)

See also
List of museums in South Korea

External links
Official site

Art museums and galleries in Seoul
Textile museums
Korean embroidery